Walter Steiner (born 15 February 1951) is a Swiss former ski jumper who competed in the 1970s.

Career
Steiner earned a ski jumping silver medal in the Individual large hill at the 1972 Winter Olympics. He also won the ski jumping competition at the Holmenkollen ski festival in 1974 and won the Ski Flying World Championships in 1972 and 1977. Steiner was awarded the Holmenkollen medal in 1977 (shared with Helena Takalo and Hilkka Kuntola). As of 2012 he resides in the Swedish rural town of Falun, working as a gardener.

On 9 March 1973, he crashed at world record distance at 175 metres (574 ft). And again two days later he crashed at record 179 metres (587 ft), both of them achieved in Oberstdorf, West Germany.

On 15 March 1974 he set and tied ski jumping world record distance at 169 metres (554 ft) with Heinz Wossipiwo. Later that day he crashed at 177 metres (581 ft) world record distance, both distances were set on Velikanka bratov Gorišek K165 in Planica, Yugoslavia.

Ski jumping world records

 Not recognized! Crash at world record distance.

Documentary
Steiner is the subject of the 1974 Werner Herzog German-language documentary film The Great Ecstasy of the Woodcarver Steiner, a.k.a. The Great Ecstasy of the Sculptor Steiner (German: Die große Ekstase des Bildschnitzers Steiner). Much of the footage shows Steiner and his psychological struggle at a competition at Planica where Herzog also appears as commentator.

References

External links

Holmenkollen medalists - click Holmenkollmedaljen for downloadable pdf file 
Holmenkollen winners since 1892 - click Vinnere for downloadable pdf file 

1951 births
Living people
Ski jumpers at the 1972 Winter Olympics
Ski jumpers at the 1976 Winter Olympics
Holmenkollen medalists
Holmenkollen Ski Festival winners
Olympic ski jumpers of Switzerland
Olympic silver medalists for Switzerland
Swiss male ski jumpers
Olympic medalists in ski jumping
Medalists at the 1972 Winter Olympics